Debra Black is an American Broadway producer and philanthropist. She is the wife of Leon Black, co-founder of Apollo Global Management.

Biography 
Black was born Debra Ressler to New York lawyer Ira Ressler. She is the sister of Tony Ressler, who co-founded Apollo Global Management with Leon Black. She graduated from Barnard College in 1976.

Black is a Broadway producer who has been nominated for ten Tony Awards, winning two in the Tony Award for Best Play category for The History Boys (2006) and The Pillow Man (2008).

Philanthropic activities 
Black and her husband co-founded the Melanoma Research Alliance, which funds melanoma research worldwide. Black is a melanoma survivor herself.

She was elected a trustee of the Rockefeller University in 2010. In 2015, She was elected a trustee of the Metropolitan Museum of Art. In 2018, she and her husband donated $40 million to the Museum of Modern Art for its renovation and expansion.

References 

Living people
Barnard College alumni
Tony Award winners
Broadway theatre producers
American philanthropists
American women philanthropists
Rockefeller University people
Year of birth missing (living people)